Arturo Cavero Velásquez (29 November 1940 – 9 October 2009), better known by the pseudonym "Zambo Cavero", was a Peruvian singer, representative of Afro-Peruvian identity.

Biography
Born in Lima, Peru, he was the son of Juan Cavero, of Huaral, and Digna Velásquez, of Cañete.

His particular singing style captivated listeners, as his intensity had the feel of Peruvian creole taste. 

Zambo Cavero specialised in performing traditional Peruvian waltz. Some of his best performances are songs by Peruvian composers Augusto Polo Campos and Félix Pasache, others are renditions of traditional Peruvian creole music, which is Afro-Peruvian influenced. On 3 June 1987 Cavero, was honoured together with important Peruvian musicians like guitar player Óscar Avilés in Washington, D. C. by the Organization of American States.

Arturo Cavero died from complications of sepsis in Hospital Edgardo Rebagliati, Lima, on 9 October 2009. Peruvian President Alan García declared a day of national mourning.

Discography
El Comercio newspaper has published his discography
 Arturo 'Zambo' Cavero
 Siempre juntos
 Siempre
 Son nuestros
 Contigo Perú
 Unicos
 Perú al Mundial
 Siguen festejando juntos
 Mueve tu cucú (EP)
 Seguimos valseando festejos
 Que tal trio

References
  Greatest Hits
  A La Molina, Live in Lima, 1978

1940 births
2009 deaths
Deaths from sepsis
20th-century Peruvian male singers
20th-century Peruvian singers
Peruvian people of African descent
Infectious disease deaths in Peru
Federico Villarreal National University alumni
Recipients of the Order of the Sun of Peru
Singers from Lima
  

Johnathans Grandpa